The Public Libraries (Ireland) Act 1902 (2 Edw. 7 c. 20) was an Act of Parliament of the Parliament of the United Kingdom, given the royal assent on 8 August 1902, and repealed in 1981.

It amended the Public Libraries Act (Ireland) 1855 to allow it to be adopted by Irish rural districts as well as urban districts, allowing them to establish public libraries.

The Act was repealed by the statutory instrument SI 1981/438.

See also
Public Libraries Act

References
The Public General Acts Passed in the Second Year of the Reign of His Majesty King Edward the Seventh. London: printed for His Majesty's Stationery Office. 1902.
Chronological table of the statutes; HMSO, London. 1993.

United Kingdom Acts of Parliament 1902
Library law
Repealed United Kingdom Acts of Parliament
Libraries in the Republic of Ireland
Acts of the Parliament of the United Kingdom concerning Ireland